Dingpu Station may refer to following train stations in Taiwan:

 Dingpu Station (Yilan), a train station on the Yilan Line operated by the Taiwan Railway Administration in Toucheng, Yilan County
 Dingpu metro station, the western terminus of the Bannan line operated by the Taipei Metro in New Taipei City